Karin Boel Bertling (born 25 May 1937) is a Swedish actress.

Selected filmography
2002–04 – Skeppsholmen (TV series)
2003 – Hannah med H
2003 – The Man Who Smiled (TV)
2004 – Camp Slaughter
2005 – Wallander – Innan frosten
2008 – Skägget i brevlådan (TV, Julkalendern)
2015 – Granny's Dancing on the Table

References

External links

1937 births
Living people
Swedish film actresses
Swedish television actresses
21st-century Swedish actresses